Down Upon the Suwanee River is a 1925 American silent drama film directed by Lem F. Kennedy and starring Charles Emmett Mack, Mary Thurman and Arthur Donaldson. The spelling of the film's titled varied with uses of both Swanee and Suwannee also used. In Britain it was released by Wardour Films.

Cast
 Charles Emmett Mack as Bill Ruble 
 Mary Thurman as Mary Norwood
 Arthur Donaldson as Dais Norwood
 Walter Merrill as Herbert Norwood 
 Walter P. Lewis as Reverend John Banner 
 Blanche Davenport as Old Mag
 Charles Shannon as Hoss-Fly Henson

References

Bibliography
 James Michael Hunter. Mormons and Popular Culture: The Global Influence of an American Phenomenon, Volume 2. ABC-CLIO, 2013.

External links
 

1925 films
1925 drama films
1920s English-language films
American silent feature films
Silent American drama films
American black-and-white films
1920s American films